The Copyright Licensing Agency (CLA) is a UK non-profit organisation established in 1983 to perform collective licensing on behalf of its members the Authors' Licensing and Collecting Society (ALCS), Publishers' Licensing Services(PLS), the Design and Artists Collecting Society (DACS) and PICSEL. The Copyright Licensing Agency is based in 5th Floor, Shackleton House, 4 Battle Bridge Lane, London, SE1 2HX.

Aim 

The Copyright Licensing Agency (CLA) is recognised by the UK government as the collective rights licensing body for text and images from book, journal and magazine content. CLA exists to simplify copyright for content users and copyright owners. Its aim is to help its customers legally access, copy or share the published content that they want, while making sure copyright owners are paid for the use of their work. As an aggregator of publisher, author and visual artist rights from 35 countries, CLA is a leading provider of licences and products to the education, corporate and public sector.   

CLA is a non-profit organisation and money collected in licence fees is distributed to the copyright owners after company costs have been deducted. In the financial year 2019/2020 CLA distributed collected £86m in fees and distributed £76.8m to its members for payment to authors, visual artists and publishers.

As well as UK publications, CLA have agreements with reproduction rights organisations (RROs) that allow employees to copy works published in over 35 other countries. CLA also work with the International Federation of Reproduction Rights Organisations (IFRRO) towards the development of international codes of conduct.

Copyright Law 

CLA is a licensing body as defined by the Copyright, Designs and Patents Act 1988.

Compliance 

CLA established its compliance arm, Copywatch in 1996. Copywatch was established in 1996 by The Copyright Licensing Agency to counter illegal copying of books, magazines and journals in the business and local authority areas.  The company is also a member of the Alliance Against IP Theft and the Trading Standards Institute.

References

External links 
 Official website

Copyright collection societies
Media and communications in the London Borough of Southwark
Organisations based in the London Borough of Southwark
Organizations established in 1983